Robert Mitchum (1917–1997) was an American actor who appeared in over 110 films and television series over the course of his career. He is ranked 23rd on the American Film Institute's list of the 50 greatest American screen legends of all time. His first credited named role was as Quinn in the 1943 western Border Patrol. That same year he appeared in the films Follow the Band, Beyond the Last Frontier, Cry 'Havoc' and Gung Ho! as well as several Hopalong Cassidy films including Colt Comrades, Bar 20, False Colors, and Riders of the Deadline. In 1944, he starred in the western Nevada as Jim "Nevada" Lacy, and a year later in the film West of the Pecos as Pecos Smith. During the 1940s, he was also cast in the film noirs Undercurrent (1946), Crossfire (1947), Out of the Past (1947) and The Big Steal (1949). Mitchum was nominated for the Academy Award for Best Supporting Actor for his role as a world-weary soldier in the 1945 film The Story of G.I. Joe, which received critical acclaim and was a commercial success.

He co-starred in films with several Golden Age actresses such as Jane Russell in His Kind of Woman (1951), Marilyn Monroe in River of No Return (1954), and Rita Hayworth in Fire Down Below (1957). He also played numerous military roles such as playing Corporal Allison, USMC in Heaven Knows, Mr. Allison (1957), Brigadier General Norman Cota in The Longest Day (1962), Lieutenant Colonel Barney Adams in Man in the Middle (1963), and Admiral William F. Halsey in Midway (1976). Mitchum portrayed serial killer Reverend Harry Powell in The Night of the Hunter (1955), and convicted rapist Max Cady in the neo-noir psychological thriller Cape Fear (1962). Both roles are listed in the AFI's 50 Greatest Screen Villains.

Mitchum departed from his typical screen persona with his critically acclaimed performance as a mild-mannered schoolmaster in David Lean's epic drama, Ryan's Daughter (1970). While the film won two Academy Awards, Mitchum, who was thought to be a contender for a Best Actor nomination, was not nominated. After the success of Ryan's Daughter, Mitchum appeared in crime dramas including The Friends of Eddie Coyle (1973), and Farewell, My Lovely (1975). His later film roles between 1980 and 1997 included Nightkill (1980), That Championship Season (1982), Mr. North (1988), Scrooged (1988), and Waiting for Sunset (1995). He was also the narrator for the 1993 western Tombstone.

His television work included playing Victor "Pug" Henry in the mini-series The Winds of War (1983) and again in War and Remembrance (1988). When The Winds of War aired, it was the most watched miniseries at its time. He was also in the 1985 miniseries North and South with Patrick Swayze and the 1989 miniseries Brotherhood of the Rose with Connie Sellecca. He had a recurring role in the TV series A Family for Joe (1990) and African Skies (1992).

Film

1940s

1950s

1960-1970s

1980s–1990s

Television

Bibliography

References

External links
 
 

Mitchum, Robert
Mitchum, Robert
Featured lists